The Hartlepool trolleybus system once served the town of West Hartlepool, and linked it with the town of Hartlepool, in County Durham, England.  The two towns have since been fused.

History
That portion had been purchased by the West Hartlepool Corporation on 31 August 1912.

The first of the West Hartlepool tramways to be closed was the Foggy Furze line, which was shut down on 4 October 1923.  The services on that line were temporarily replaced by motor buses, until opening of the trolleybus system.  The Ward Jackson Park tramway was next to be closed, in November 1925.

Conversion of the tramway from West Hartlepool to Hartlepool was a more complex process, because the Hartlepool Corporation had obtained powers to run motor buses.  Following lengthy negotiations, Hartlepool purchased the portion of the tramway within its boundaries, and, under the Hartlepool Corporation Trolley Vehicles Act 1926, was given powers to operate trolleybuses.  Conversion of the West Hartlepool to Hartlepool line then took place on 22 February 1927.

One month later, on 25 March 1927, the Seaton Carew tramway was converted, bringing Hartlepool's tramway era to an end, and its trolleybus system to its greatest extent.

The system as a whole was operated by West Hartlepool Corporation.  However, the route between the two towns was run on behalf of both authorities.  The trolleybuses used on that route were jointly owned; each Corporation paid half the running costs of the joint route and was entitled to half of its revenue.

After the end of World War II, West Hartlepool Corporation decided to replace the trolleybus system with motor buses. In 1949, the Seaton Carew route was shut down. Closure of the other two West Hartlepool lines soon followed.

Services
By the standards of the various now defunct trolleybus systems in the United Kingdom, the Hartlepool system, with its four routes, was quite small.

Fleet
West Hartlepool's first trolleybuses were four Railless 4-wheel vehicles with Short Brothers 36-seat bodywork.  They were numbered 1–4.  In 1926, they were joined by two similar vehicles (Nos. 5–6) and a double-deck version (No. 7).

The first jointly owned vehicles were twelve Straker-Clough single-deckers (Nos. 8–19).  They entered service in 1927.  In 1938, these vehicles were replaced by more jointly owned units, this time high capacity double-deckers (Nos. 32–39), built by Daimler. All of the jointly owned vehicles carried the armorial devices of the two Corporations on their side panels.

The system had a total fleet of 48 trolleybuses, with a maximum of 31 in service at any one time. None of them is recorded as having survived.

See also

History of Hartlepool
Transport in Hartlepool
List of trolleybus systems in the United Kingdom

References

Notes

Further reading

External links

National Trolleybus Archive
British Trolleybus Society, based in Reading.
National Trolleybus Association, based in London.

Transport in the Borough of Hartlepool
Hartlepool
Hartlepool
History of Hartlepool